Ponte del Risorgimento (or briefly Ponte Risorgimento) is a bridge that links Piazzale delle Belle Arti to Piazza Monte Grappa in Rome (Italy), in the Flaminio and Della Vittoria quarters.

History and description 
The bridge links the area of Lungotevere delle Armi to Piazzale delle Belle Arti.

The works for the building began in 1909 and were completed two years later. 
The bridge was designed and built by Giovanni Antonio Porcheddu, with the cooperation of the engineers Giaj and Parvopassu, on the occasion of the exhibition for celebrating the 50th anniversary of Italian unification. It is the first bridge in Rome made in reinforced concrete, since its creator, at that time, was the only Italian dealer of the patent of the Belgian François Hennebique.

The day of the inauguration (April 17, 1911), the spectators doubted that the structure, after the removal of the supporting scaffoldings, wouldn't have stood up; on the contrary, Porcheddu was so sure about the effectiveness and reliability of the new technique that he wanted to attend the demolition of the scaffolding on a little boat just below the arch of the bridge, together with his two youngest kids, Giuseppe and Ambrogia. During the ceremony, King Victor Emmanuel III offered Porcheddu the epithet "King of reinforced concrete".

In the middle of the bridge, on both bulwarks, are two inscriptions:

on one side, and

on the other.

Notes

Bibliography 

Bridges completed in 1911
Bridges in Rome
Stone bridges in Italy
Rome Q. I Flaminio
Rome Q. XV Della Vittoria
1911 establishments in Italy